Joseph Johann Kauffmann (27 February 1707 – 11 January 1782); other first name spellings in references: Josef Johann, Johann Joseph) was an Austrian painter known for his portraits, church decorations and castle depictions. Along with his wife Cleophea Lutz he had a single child, his daughter Angelika Kauffmann (*1741), is also remembered as a painter.

Life 
He was born in Schwarzenberg, Austria, and is described as a relatively poor man with painting skills. The original family home was a small village in the Austrian alps called Schwarzenberg in the Vorarlberg area. In the years 1740 to 1742 he was in duty of the prince-bishop from Chur/Switzerland.

In 1755 the family moved to Milan until in 1757 the mother died and father with daughter returned to Schwarzenberg. There they helped in painting the interiors of the recently heavily fire damaged local church house. The father concentrated on the general interior whilst his daughter worked on the apostle images. At a later time she donated the high altar piece in form of paintings from her own hand.

In the same period the church painting took place the family was traveling the nearby northern lakeside of Lake Constance doing works for the Tettnang seated Montfort counts in form of castle depictions and similar, and going further to Meersburg and even Konstanz.

In 1760 they left for Italy again in order to do studies on classical and Renaissance art there. Whilst the travels they earned money by portraying locals along their path. Up to 1766 they went to Rome with intermediate halts in Milan, Modena, Parma and Florence. On 5 October 1762 the daughter received honorable membership of the Accademia di Bologna. In 1764 this got topped by joining the Accademia di San Luca in Rome on a similar base.

The traveling Englishman and actor David Garrick gave the daughter the chance to portrait her which in turn went into her master piece making her finally famous. On recommendation of Lady Wentworth both moved to London and stayed there starting 1766.

He was the person who taught his daughter painting at the age of 11 that helped her much in her later career all across Europe including England and Italy up to being a foundation member of the Royal Society of Arts. Even in later years some travels along with or for meeting with his daughter have obviously taken place. A strong relation to Italy was further there as he successfully recommended his daughter to marry the venetian painter Antonio Zucchi for her second partner. The marriage took place in Juli 1781. As a result, father and the couple travelled south visiting Flandern, Schwarzenberg, Verona and Padua. In October of the same year they arrived in Venice, where Kauffmann died in the following January.

Resources 

1707 births
1782 deaths
18th-century Austrian painters
18th-century Austrian male artists
Austrian male painters
Angelica Kauffman